Nigerian Communications Satellite (NIGCOMSAT) Limited is a company under the  supervision of the Federal Ministry of Communications and Digital Economy.

Satellites

NigComSat-1 
NigComSat-1, a Nigerian satellite ordered and built in China in 2004, was Nigeria's second satellite and Africa's first communication satellite. It was launched on 13 May 2007, on board a Chinese Long March 3B carrier rocket, from the Xichang Satellite Launch Centre in China. The spacecraft was operated by NIGCOMSAT LTD and the Nigerian Space Agency, NASRDA. On 11 November 2008, NigComSat-1 was de-orbit after running out of power due to an anomaly in its solar array. It was based on the Chinese DFH-4 satellite bus, and carried different transponders: 4 C band; 14 Ku band; 8 Ka band; and 2 L band. It was designed to provide coverage to many parts of Africa, and the Ka band transponders would also cover Italy.

On 10 November 2008 (0900 GMT), the satellite was reportedly switched off for analysis and to avoid a possible collision with other satellites and was put into "emergency mode operation in order to effect mitigation and repairs". The satellite eventually was de-orbited later on in the same month. According to internal sources, the situation was caused by a problem with the solar panels of the satellite, which further lead to reduced functioning capacity.

On 24 March 2009, the Nigerian Federal Ministry of Science and Technology, NIGCOMSAT Ltd. and CGWIC signed a further contract for the in-orbit delivery of NigComSat-1R satellite. NigComSat-1R was also a DFH-4 satellite.

NigComSat-1R 
On 19 December 2011, a new Nigerian communications satellite was launched into orbit by China in Xichang. The satellite according to Nigerian President Goodluck Jonathan which was paid for by the insurance policy on NigComSat-1 which failed in 2008, would have a positive impact on national development in various sectors such as communications, internet services, health, agriculture, environmental protection and national security.

References

External links 

 http://www.nigcomsat.gov.ng
 NigComSat 1R 42° E (42.5° E) Footprint

Government of Nigeria